Sam Rayburn is a census-designated place and unincorporated community in Jasper County, Texas, United States. Its population was 1,273 as of the 2020 census. The community, which is also known as Rayburn Country, is located on the south shore of the Sam Rayburn Reservoir at the junction of Texas Recreational Road 255 and Farm to Market Road 1007. Sam Rayburn was founded in the 1970s after the formation of the reservoir; its main attraction is its country club, Rayburn Country.

Demographics 

As of the 2020 United States census, there were 1,273 people, 429 households, and 315 families residing in the CDP.

References

Census-designated places in Jasper County, Texas
Census-designated places in Texas
Unincorporated communities in Jasper County, Texas
Unincorporated communities in Texas
Populated places established in the 1970s
1970s establishments in Texas